Paul L. Groth is an American attorney and former professional tennis player. He is a Founding Partner of Groth, Makarenko, Kaiser and Eidex, a law firm in Suwanee, Georgia.

Groth, raised in Atlanta, attended the University of Georgia on a tennis scholarship. He earned All-SEC selection in 1981 and was a doubles participant in the NCAA championships with Brent Crymes.

Competing on the professional tour in the 1980s, Groth was a main draw qualifier at the 1983 French Open, where he had to retire hurt in the fourth set of his first round match against Patrice Kuchna.

References

External links
 
 

Year of birth missing (living people)
Living people
American male tennis players
Tennis players from Atlanta
Georgia Bulldogs tennis players